The Journal of Approximation Theory is "devoted to advances in pure and applied approximation theory and related areas."

References

External links
 Journal of Approximation Theory web site
 Journal of Approximation Theory home page at Elsevier

Mathematics journals
Approximation theory
Publications established in 1968
Elsevier academic journals
English-language journals
Monthly journals